Kopa Bukowska is a peak in the Bieszczady Mountains in southern Poland.

Mountains of Poland